Michel Leclère (born 18 March 1946 in Mantes-la-Jolie, Yvelines) is a former motor racing driver from France. He participated in eight Formula One Grands Prix, debuting on 5 October 1975, and scored no championship points.

Career

After winning the French Formula 3 championship, driving for Alpine, in 1972, Leclère performed well in Formula 2. This earned him his chance in Formula One. The relationship was not a success, however, and he returned to Formula 2. After a bad season with Kauhsen in 1978, he retired.

He has recently been involved with the Renault H&C Classic Team and has demonstrated and raced some of the historic Formula One cars and other machinery in their keeping, at various events around Europe.

Racing record

Complete European Formula Two Championship results
(key) (Races in bold indicate pole position; races in italics indicate fastest lap)

Complete Formula One results
(key)

24 Hours of Le Mans results

References
Footnotes

Sources

1946 births
Living people
People from Mantes-la-Jolie
French racing drivers
French Formula Renault 2.0 drivers
French Formula One drivers
Tyrrell Formula One drivers
Williams Formula One drivers
Wolf Formula One drivers
European Formula Two Championship drivers
French Formula Three Championship drivers
24 Hours of Le Mans drivers
Sportspeople from Yvelines